Philippe Malivoire (7 August 1942 – 10 May 2013) was a French rower. He competed in the men's coxless four event at the 1964 Summer Olympics.

References

External links
 

1942 births
2013 deaths
French male rowers
Olympic rowers of France
Rowers at the 1964 Summer Olympics
Place of birth missing
World Rowing Championships medalists for France